Marios Kostoulas (born 12 March 1996) is a Greek professional footballer who plays as a defensive midfielder for Super League 2 club Iraklis.

References

1996 births
Living people
Greek footballers
Super League Greece players
Football League (Greece) players
Super League Greece 2 players
Gamma Ethniki players
Atromitos F.C. players
Ionikos F.C. players
Diagoras F.C. players
Iraklis Thessaloniki F.C. players
Apollon Larissa F.C. players
Association football midfielders
Footballers from Larissa